Altar (O'odham: Wawuk) is small city and municipal seat of Altar Municipality in the Mexican state of Sonora.

The town of Altar is situated on the important Mexicali to Hermosillo Highway (Federal Highway 2).  Most of the roads leading into the desert are not paved.

Climate

See also 
 Centro Comunitario de Atencion al Migrante y Necesitado (CCAMYN)

References 

 Enciclopedia de los Municipios de Mexico
 INEGI

Notes

External links 
 Altar, Ayuntamiento Digital (Official WebSite of Altar, Sonora)
 Pulitzer Center Project on Illegal Immigration
 MotherJones.com article on the mexican exodus across the desert
 Article on illegal immigrants from MSN
 Braceros: sanctuary for border crossers
 Altar, tierra de coyotes Article in Spanish about illegal border crossing

Tohono O'odham
Populated places in Sonora
Populated places in the Sonoran Desert of Mexico
1775 establishments in New Spain